Carlos Joseph Marcello (born Calogero Minacore ; February 6, 1910 – March 3, 1993) was an Italian-American crime boss of the New Orleans crime family from 1947 to 1983.

Aside from his role in the American Mafia, he is also notorious for the reason that G. Robert Blakey and others have alleged that Carlos Marcello, Santo Trafficante Jr., and Sam Giancana conspired in the 1963 assassination of U.S. President John F. Kennedy in retaliation for federal investigations and prosecutions that threatened both the power and the 
multibillion-dollar profits of organized crime.

Early life
Marcello was born on February 6, 1910, to Sicilian immigrants Giuseppe and Luigia Minacore, in Tunis, French Tunisia. With his family, Marcello immigrated to the United States in 1911 and settled in a decaying plantation house near Metairie in Jefferson Parish, a suburb of New Orleans. His father adopted a different family name to avoid confusion with his supervisor on the sugar plantation where he had started work. His overseer, also Minacore, chose the appellation Marcello. The family changed all their other names, and Calogero Minacore became Carlos Joseph Marcello. He had eight siblings: Peter, Rose, Mary, Pascal, Vincent, Joseph Jr., Anthony and Salvador Marcello.

Young Marcello turned to petty crime in the French Quarter. He was later imprisoned for masterminding a crew of teenage gangsters who carried out armed robberies in the small towns surrounding New Orleans. At the time, local newspapers compared him to the character of Fagin from Charles Dickens' novel Oliver Twist. This conviction was later overturned. However, the following year he was convicted of assault and robbery and was sentenced to the Louisiana State Penitentiary in West Feliciana Parish for nine years. He was released after five years.

In 1938, Marcello was arrested and charged with the sale of more than 10 kg (23 pounds) of marijuana. Despite receiving another lengthy prison sentence and a $76,830 fine, Marcello served less than ten months and only paid a $400 fine thanks to a deal cut with former Governor Huey Long. On his release from prison, Marcello became associated with Frank Costello, the leader of the Genovese crime family, in New York City. At the time, Costello was involved in transporting illegal slot machines from New York City to New Orleans. Marcello provided the muscle and arranged for the machines to be placed in local businesses.

Louisiana crime boss
By the end of 1947, Marcello had taken control of Louisiana's illegal gambling network. He had also joined forces with Genovese crime family associate Meyer Lansky in order to skim money from some of the most important casinos in the New Orleans area shortly after becoming associated with the Todaro family through marriage. According to former members of the Chicago Outfit, Marcello was also assigned a cut of the money skimmed from Las Vegas casinos, in exchange for providing "muscle" in Florida real estate deals. By this time, Marcello had been selected as "The Godfather" of the New Orleans Mafia, by the family's capos and with the approval of The Commission after the deportation of his predecessor, Sylvestro Carolla, to Sicily. He held this position for the next thirty years. In a 1975 extortion trial, two witnesses described Marcello as "The Godfather" of the New Orleans crime syndicate.

Marcello appeared before the U.S. Senate's Kefauver Committee on organized crime on January 25, 1951. He pleaded the Fifth Amendment 152 times. The Committee called Marcello "one of the worst criminals in the country".

Marcello continued the family's long-standing tradition of fierce independence from interference by mafiosi in other areas. He enacted a policy that forbade mafiosi from other families from visiting Louisiana without first asking permission.

On March 24, 1959, Marcello appeared before the United States Senate's McClellan Committee investigating organized crime. Serving as Chief Counsel to the committee was Robert F. Kennedy; his brother, Senator John F. Kennedy, was a member of the committee. In response to committee questioning, Marcello invoked the Fifth Amendment and refused to answer any questions relating to his background, activities, and associates. From then on, Marcello became an avowed enemy of the Kennedys.

The New Orleans crime family frequently met at Mosca's Italian restaurant in the New Orleans suburb of Avondale, in a building which Marcello had owned.

Prosecution
On April 4, 1961, the U.S. Justice Department, under the direction of Attorney General Robert F. Kennedy, apprehended Marcello as he made what he assumed was a routine visit to the immigration authorities in New Orleans, then deported him to Guatemala. Two months later, he was back in New Orleans. Thereafter, he successfully fought efforts by the government to deport him. His immigration lawyer was Jack Wasserman.

In November 1963, Marcello was tried for "conspiracy to defraud the United States government by obtaining a false Guatemalan birth certificate" and "conspiracy to obstruct the United States government in the exercise of its right to deport Carlos Marcello". He was acquitted later that month on both charges. However, in October 1964, Marcello was charged with "conspiring to obstruct justice by fixing a juror [Rudolph Heitler] and seeking the murder of a government witness [Carl Noll]". Marcello's attorney admitted Heitler had been bribed but said that there was no evidence to connect the bribe with Marcello. Noll refused to testify against Marcello in the case. Marcello was acquitted of both charges.
 
In September 1966, 13 members of the New York, Louisiana and Florida crime families were arrested for "consorting with known criminals" at the La Stella Restaurant in Queens, New York. However, the charges were later dropped. Returning to New Orleans a few days later, Marcello was arrested for assaulting an FBI agent. His first trial resulted in a hung jury, but he was retried and convicted. He was sentenced to two years but served less than six months.

In 1981, Marcello, Aubrey W. Young (a former aide to Governor John J. McKeithen), Charles E. Roemer, II (former commissioner of administration to Governor Edwin Edwards), and two other men were indicted in the U.S. District Court for the Eastern District of Louisiana in New Orleans with conspiracy, racketeering, and mail and wire fraud in a scheme to bribe state officials to give the five men multimillion-dollar insurance contracts. The charges were the result of a Federal Bureau of Investigation probe known as BriLab. U.S. District Judge Morey Sear allowed the admission of secretly-recorded conversations that he said demonstrated corruption at the highest levels of state government. Marcello and Roemer were convicted, but Young and the two others were acquitted.

Kennedy assassination
In its 1978 investigation of the assassination of John F. Kennedy, the House Select Committee on Assassinations said that it recognized Jack Ruby's murder of Lee Harvey Oswald as a primary reason to suspect organized crime as possibly having involvement in the assassination. In its investigation, the HSCA noted the presence of "credible associations relating both Lee Harvey Oswald and Jack Ruby to figures having a relationship, albeit tenuous, with Marcello's crime family or organization". Their report stated: "The committee found that Marcello had the motive, means and opportunity to have President John F. Kennedy assassinated, though it was unable to establish direct evidence of Marcello's complicity".

In their book, Fatal Hour: The Assassination of President Kennedy By Organized Crime, authors Richard N. Billings and G. Robert Blakey (who was chief counsel of the House Select Committee on Assassinations and previously Special Attorney in the Organized Crime and Racketeering Section of the Criminal Division of the U.S. Department of Justice under Attorney General Robert F. Kennedy) conclude that President Kennedy's murder was planned and carried out by Marcello and conspirators. They claim that their book lays out evidence that has been corroborated by additional sources and official records released in subsequent years.

In his 1989 book, Mafia Kingfish: Carlos Marcello and the Assassination of John F. Kennedy, author John H. Davis implicates Marcello in the assassination of Kennedy. According to Davis, Oswald and Ruby had "strong ties" to Marcello.

In his 1994 autobiography Mob Lawyer, attorney Frank Ragano says that he relayed a message in 1963 from Teamsters Union leader Jimmy Hoffa to Marcello and Santo Trafficante, the Mafia boss of Florida, urging the two Mafia bosses to kill Kennedy. Ragano later claimed that four days before Trafficante died, the mob boss described to Ragano how he and Marcello organized the murder of President Kennedy.

In his 2013 book The Hidden History of the JFK Assassination, Lamar Waldron claimed that Marcello masterminded the assassination of Kennedy. According to Waldron, Marcello admitted his involvement to two other inmates during a fit of rage in the prison yard at the Federal Correctional Institution in Texarkana, Texas. In his book, Waldron also presented the account of Marcello's prison cellmate, Jack Van Laningham, who claimed in 1985 that Marcello bragged to him that he had masterminded the Kennedy assassination, while planting red herrings to confuse the press and embarrass the FBI and CIA into suppressing evidence. According to Waldron, Marcello arranged for two hit men to carry out the assassination after entering the United States from Canada and Europe, while setting up Oswald as the fall guy and ordering the subsequent murder of various conspirators and witnesses who risked turning informants, including mobsters Johnny Roselli and Sam Giancana.

According to criminal underworld investigator and author Charles Brandt, "While in Texarkana Federal prison, during a two-day period in which Marcello was having blood pressure problems and was sent to the prison hospital, Marcello spoke to medical attendants as if they were members of his crime family. On three occasions he told them he had just met in New York with [Genovese capo Tony] 'Provenzano' and they would soon be celebrating, because they were 'going to get that smiling m.f. Kennedy in Dallas".

Personal life
In 1936, Marcello married Jacqueline Todaro, the niece of senior New Orleans Mafioso Frank Todaro. They had four children, Louise Hampton, Joseph C. Marcello, Florence Black and Jacqueline Dugas.

Death
Early in 1989, Marcello suffered a series of strokes. In July, in a surprise move, the 5th U.S. Circuit Court of Appeals threw out his BriLab conviction. One judge denied this reversal, but his decision in turn was overruled. In October, after having served six years and six months of his sentence, Marcello was released. Carlos Marcello died on March 2, 1993.

In popular culture
In Bryce Zabel's 2014 novel Surrounded by Enemies: A Breakpoint Novel, in an alternative universe where President Kennedy survived the assassination, but agent Clint Hill and Texas Governor John Connally were killed, President Kennedy talked to his brother Attorney General Robert F. Kennedy, discussing suspects, including Marcello. Codenamed "New Orleans", Marcello was said to have motive and resources to carry out the attack.
Sal Marcano, the chief antagonist of Mafia III is loosely based on Carlos Marcello.
He is mentioned two times in Martin Scorsese's crime film The Irishman, which stars Robert De Niro as Frank Sheeran, who says: "But Bobby also goes after Giancana, Marcello, Trafficante, and all the other guys who put his brother in the White House in the first place". During the Frank Sheeran Appreciation Night, Anthony "Fat Tony" Salerno tells Russell Bufalino (referring to Jimmy Hoffa) "Because his guys are holding 'em back loans on Carlos's new hotel in New Orleans".

See also

Italians in New Orleans

References

External links

1910 births
1993 deaths
American gangsters of Italian descent
American gangsters of Sicilian descent
Deaths from Alzheimer's disease
Neurological disease deaths in Louisiana
New Orleans crime family
Prisoners and detainees of the United States federal government
People associated with the assassination of John F. Kennedy
People from Tunis
People from New Orleans
People from Metairie, Louisiana
Tunisian emigrants to the United States
Tunisian people of Italian descent
Tunisian people of Sicilian descent